The wooden-hulled, twin-screw, steam yacht Akela—built in 1899 at Morris Heights, N.Y., by the Gas Engine and Power Co. and the Charles L. Seabury Co.—was acquired by the Navy from Bridgeport, Connecticut businessman Henry Alfred Bishop and delivered on 24 December 1917. Redesignated  was commissioned at the New York Navy Yard on 16 April 1918.

Assigned to the Armed Guard Inspection Board of the 3d Naval District, Akela took inspection parties to various merchant ships with embarked armed guard detachments over the next several months. Entering the Seabury yard at Morris Heights on 6 November, Akela was still there, undergoing repairs, when the armistice was signed on 11 November 1918. She remained there, inactive and "awaiting orders", into the spring of 1919. The last formal entry in the ship's log, dated 15 April, does not report a formal decommissioning. In any case, the ship was returned to her owner on that day and stricken from the Navy list exactly one month later.

References
 
 Department of the Navy Naval History and Heritage Command Online Library of Selected Images: Civilian Ships: Akela (American Steam Yacht, 1899).Served as USS Akela (SP-1793) in 1918–1919
 NavSource Online: Section Patrol Craft Photo Archive Akela (SP 1793)

Patrol vessels of the United States Navy
World War I patrol vessels of the United States
Ships built in Morris Heights, Bronx
1899 ships
Individual yachts